The 1936 Rutgers Queensmen football team represented Rutgers University in the 1936 college football season. In their sixth season under head coach J. Wilder Tasker, the Queensmen compiled a 1–6–1 record and were outscored by their opponents 133 to 20.

Schedule

References

Rutgers
Rutgers Scarlet Knights football seasons
Rutgers Queensmen football